Régina Airport  is an airport serving Régina, a commune of French Guiana on the Approuague River. The runway lies along the west side of the village.

See also

 List of airports in French Guiana
 Transport in French Guiana

References

External links
OpenStreetMap - Régina
SkyVector Aeronautical Charts - Régina

Airports in French Guiana
Buildings and structures in Régina